Brynjar Kvaran (born 16 January 1958) is an Icelandic former handball player who competed in the 1984 Summer Olympics and in the 1988 Summer Olympics.

References

1958 births
Living people
Brynjar Kvaran
Brynjar Kvaran
Handball players at the 1984 Summer Olympics
Handball players at the 1988 Summer Olympics
Brynjar Kvaran